Muscle Museum is the second EP by English rock band Muse. Recorded in 1998 at Sawmills Studios with producer Paul Reeve, it was released on 11 January 1999 by Dangerous Records, limited to 999 hand-numbered copies. The EP features six tracks, five of which were released again later – "Instant Messenger" (as "Pink Ego Box") was featured as the B-side to the band's third single "Muscle Museum", while four were re-recorded for the group's debut full-length album Showbiz.

Recording and release
As with their self-titled debut EP, Muse recorded Muscle Museum at Dennis Smith's Sawmills Studios with producer Paul Reeve, with the sessions taking place in 1998. Reeve also performed additional backing vocals "Unintended" and "Instant Messenger". Muscle Museum was released in the same way as the Muse EP, on Smith's Dangerous Records limited to 999 numbered copies, on 11 January 1999. Some additional copies were pressed on CD-R not including the second version of "Muscle Museum", while media contacts were sent non-numbered copies. Journalist Mark Beaumont has described the EP's release as "low-key", calling it a "stop-gap" release.

Reception and legacy
The Muscle Museum EP gained Muse national exposure, thanks in part to the NME who featured Muse following its release. The EP entered the NME Indie Singles Chart at number 3, behind major label acts Mercury Rev and Fatboy Slim. However, according to Muse: Inside the Muscle Museum author Ben Myers, early reviews of the release were not particularly positive: fanzine Robots and Electric Brains, for example, sarcastically likened the band's sound to that of Radiohead, with whom they were compared often. A number of tracks from the EP were played on Steve Lamacq's show on BBC Radio 1 a few weeks after its release.

Track listing

Personnel
Muse
Matt Bellamy – vocals, guitars, piano, Hammond organ, mellotron, production
Chris Wolstenholme – bass, backing vocals, production
Dominic Howard – drums, production
Additional personnel
Paul Reeve – production, engineering, mixing, backing vocals (tracks 4 and 5)
Mark Thomas – engineering assistance
John Cornfield – mastering
Phil Andrews – photography
Steve Conner – graphic design

References

Bibliography

External links
Muscle Museum on the band's official website

1999 EPs
Muse (band) albums